TVP3 Kraków (TVP Cracow) is one of the regional branches of the TVP, Poland's public television broadcaster. It serves the entire Lesser Poland Voivodeship.

External links 
Official website

Telewizja Polska
Television channels and stations established in 1961
Mass media in Kraków